Šimánek (feminine Šimánková) is a Czech surname. It may refer to:

 Jana Šimánková, Czech volleyball player
 Jiří Šimánek (b. 1978), Czech ice hockey player
 Otto Šimánek (1925–1992), Czech actor
 Robert E. Simanek (1930–2022), American marine

Czech-language surnames